Andreas Ratschiller (born November 28, 1983) is an Austrian ice hockey player. He is currently playing with EC Oilers Salzburg in the Austrian Oberliga.

During the 2004–05 season, Ratschiller played two games with EC Red Bull Salzburg of the Austrian Hockey League

References

External links

1983 births
Living people
Austrian ice hockey defencemen
EC Red Bull Salzburg players